McCarthy Point is an ice-covered point that marks the northeastern extremity of Grant Island on the seaward edge of the Getz Ice Shelf, Antarctica.

References

Headlands of Marie Byrd Land